Union for the New Republic (in French: Union pour la Nouvelle République, UNR) was a political party in Guinea, led by Mamadou Bâ. In 1998, it merged with Siradiou Diallo's Renewal and Progress Party to form the Union for Progress and Renewal (UPR).

See also 
 Union for Progress and Renewal (Guinea).
 Siradiou Diallo.
 Politics of Guinea.
 List of political parties in Guinea.
 Elections in Guinea.
 Political party.

References

Further reading 
 
 

Defunct political parties in Guinea